Raghuvir  may refer to:

Lord Rama, Lord Rama
Raghuvir (spiritual leader), Hindu religious leader.
Raghuvir Sahay, Hindi poet
Raghuvir Sharan Mitra, Hindi poet
Raghuvir Patel, Kenyan cricketer
Raghuvir Singh Kadian, Indian politician
Anisetti Raghuvir, Governor of Assam

See also
Raghuveer (disambiguation)